"A Deal in Ostriches" is a short story by the British writer H. G. Wells.  It is a cautionary tale about simple human greed.  The taxidermist of Wells’ story "Triumphs of a Taxidermist" (1894) makes a return appearance as the narrator of the story.

Background
The story was originally published anonymously in the December 20th, 1894 issue of the Pall Mall Gazette and later republished in the 1895 short story collection The Stolen Bacillus and Other Incidents. The story is the tale of a carefully crafted and skillfully executed con or scam that exploited the natural greed of the protagonist's fellow passengers.

Plot
The taxidermist is talking with an unnamed acquaintance about the price of birds when he tells the story of a bird auction on an East India Company ship en route from India to London. Sir Mohini Padishah, a wealthy native Indian, is aboard the vessel.  An unnamed caretaker, was on deck with five ostriches when one of the birds swallowed the diamond from Padishah’s turban.  The bird becomes mixed with the others during the resulting confusion.  Word of the incident sweeps the vessel as Padishah demands the return of the diamond.  He swore he would retrieve the diamond, but would not buy the birds.  He demands his rights as a British Subject and plans to appeal to the British House of Lords.

The passengers debate the legalities of the situation.  As no barrister is aboard, much of the discussions are speculation.  Padishah demands the ostriches from the caretaker who refuses because he does not own the birds. Following a stopover in Aden, Padishah offers to buy all five birds.  The caretaker refuses, but tells Padishah that another passenger, Potter, made a similar offer.  While in Aden, Potter wired the birds owners in London, made the offer and his answer would be waiting in Suez.  He intends to kill the birds to find the diamond.  Padisha raged over this and the taxidermist cursed himself for not having thought of it.

The birds’ owner accepted Potter’s offer and Padishah wept over the sale.  Potter offered to sell the birds to Padishah for more than twice the amount he paid.  When Padishah balked, Potter sells the birds at auction on the ship. Interest in the auction flared when a Jewish diamond merchant assessed the diamond at three to four thousand British Pounds.  After the first bird sold was slaughtered upon the deck, Potter forbid their slaughter until landfall in London.  The price for each subsequent bird grew netting Potter more than one thousand Pounds.  Padishah provided each new owner with his address and begged the men to mail the diamond once they found it.  They rebuffed him and went their own ways.

A week later, the taxidermist sees Padishah and Potter together in London.  Padishah was an eminent Hindu, the diamond was indeed real, but the taxidermist doubts the bird swallowed the diamond.

References

External links
 

1894 short stories
Short stories by H. G. Wells
Works originally published in The Pall Mall Gazette